Komunë (definite form in Albanian: Komuna) most commonly translated as municipality or commune in English. It may refer to;

Notes and references
Notes:

References:

Types of administrative division

sq:Komuna